Sattathin Thirappu Vizhaa is 1989 Indian Tamil-language legal thriller film written, produced and directed by M. Bhaskar. The film stars Karthik, Shobana and Ravichandran, with Nizhalgal Ravi, Kuyili and Rajesh in supporting roles. It was released on 16 June 1989.

Plot 

When Rajesh, a lawyer, learns that his father Gandhiram is alive and imprisoned for a murder he did not commit, he decides to reopen the case. His biggest obstacle is his lover's father, a prosecutor.

Cast 
 Karthik as Rajesh
 Shobana as Radha
 Ravichandran as Ethiraj
 Major Sundarrajan as DSP
 Nizhalgal Ravi as Gandhiram
 Sumithra
 Kuyili as Ponni
 Rajesh as Prabhu Das
 Vennira Aadai Moorthy as Punniyam
 A. R. Srinivasan
 Veera Raghavan as Judge

Soundtrack 
The soundtrack was composed by Shankar–Ganesh.

References

External links 
 

1980s Tamil-language films
1989 thriller films
1989 films
Fictional portrayals of the Tamil Nadu Police
Films directed by M. Bhaskar
Films scored by Shankar–Ganesh
Films set in Chennai
Indian courtroom films
Indian legal films
Indian thriller films
Legal thriller films